Starstruck is a BBC comedy series created by  Rose Matafeo, co-written with Alice Snedden, directed by Karen Maine, and starring Matafeo and Nikesh Patel with Minnie Driver in a special guest starring role. A second series was commissioned before the first series aired. Series one premiered 25 April 2021 and series two was released on 2 February 2022. In June 2022, the series was renewed for a third season. The series received positive critical reception.

Premise
A screwball comedy about a 20-something New Zealand woman living in Hackney, London, working jobs in a cinema and as a nanny. After a one-night stand on New Year's Eve, she discovers she slept with a famous movie star.

Cast

Main
 Rose Matafeo as Jessie, a New Zealander living and working in London who has a one-night stand with a stranger who turns out to be a movie star
 Nikesh Patel as Tom Kapoor, an A-list actor and Jessie's love interest
 Emma Sidi as Kate, Jessie's best friend and flatmate

Recurring
 Sindhu Vee as Sindhu
 Al Roberts as Ian, Kate's boyfriend
 Jon Pointing as Dan
 Joe Barnes as Joe
 Nic Sampson as Steve 
 Lola-Rose Maxwell as Sarah
 Abraham Popoola as Jacob
 Ambreen Razia as Shivani 
 Nadia Parkes as Sophie Diller
 Liz Kingsman as Liz
 Russell Tovey (series 2)

Guest
 Minnie Driver as Cath, Tom's agent

Episodes

Series 1 (2021)

Series 2 (2022)

Production
Sidi and Matafeo are real life flatmates in London. The idea for the plot came in part from a group of Matafeo's Kiwi friends who one night in a London pub ran into a major Hollywood actor and hung out with him all night. Filming was due to begin in March 2020 but was postponed by the COVID-19 pandemic until October 2020.

HBO Max announced that Starstruck was renewed for a second series on 10 June 2021, the day it debuted on the streaming network. Russell Tovey was announced as a new cast member for series two.

In June 2022 it was announced the series had been renewed for a third season. In January 2023 Matafeo uploaded photographs from the set to her Instagram.

Release
Starstruck series 1 started broadcast in the UK on 26 April 2021 on BBC One, with the whole series available from 25 April 2021 on BBC iPlayer. It screened on TVNZ in New Zealand, ABC TV in Australia. Series 1 was released on HBO Max on 10 June 2021. Series 2 was released online in its entirety on BBC iPlayer on 7 February 2022.

Reception
The series received critical acclaim. The Times described it as "expertly crafted old-school screwball comedy, crackling with wit and sexual chemistry." Series one holds a 100% on review aggregator Rotten Tomatoes.

Accolades
In January 2023 Matafeo received a nomination for Outstanding Comedy Actress for her work on Starstruck at the National Comedy Awards 2023.

Matafeo was nominated in the Comedy Performance (Female) category at the Royal Television Society Programme Awards in March 2023.

References

External links
 Starstruck at BBC
 

2021 British television series debuts
2020s British comedy television series
BBC television comedy
Television shows set in London
English-language television shows